Matapanui is a genus of eomysticetid baleen whale from the Late Oligocene (early Chattian) Kokoamu Greensand of New Zealand.

Taxonomy
Matapanui was originally named Matapa, but that name was already in use for a genus of butterfly, necessitating the name change.

Paleobiology
Based on the enlarged temporal fossae and enlarged mandibular canal, Matapanui was probably incapable of lunge-feeding, although it remains unclear whether it could skim-feed or filter prey in the benthic zone. Waharoa shared its habitat with the odontocetes Awamokoa, Austrosqualodon, Otekaikea, and Waipatia, and the mysticetes Horopeta, Mauicetus, Tohoraata, Tokarahia, Waharoa, and Whakakai.

References 

Prehistoric cetacean genera
Oligocene cetaceans
Paleogene Oceania
Fossils of New Zealand
Fossil taxa described in 2016